Gobonamang Prudence Marekwa is a South African politician, trade unionist and police officer who has served as a Member of the National Assembly of South Africa since November 2021, representing the African National Congress.

Early life and education
Marekwa was born in Kimberley. She has a diploma in education as well as certificates in economic development and personnel and training management. She also holds an advanced diploma in public administration and went on to study for a bachelor's degree in business administration.

Career
Marekwa joined her local South African Police Service (SAPS) station in 1991. She completed her training in Hammanskraal in June 1992 and began working for the Kimberley police station. In 1993, she joined the Police and Prisons Civil Rights Union (POPCRU). She became a shop steward for the union two years later. She was elected deputy secretary for the former Diamond Field Branch in 1996. Marekwa became deputy secretary of the provincial interim gender structure in 1997. She served as deputy secretary of the Kimberley branch for two years from 1997 to 1999, before she was elected as branch secretary, a position she held until 2001. In 2001, she was deputy provincial secretary of POPCRU.

Marekwa was elected treasurer of the Congress of South African Trade Unions' (COSATU) Northern Cape and Free State region in 2001 and served in the position until 2008. She also served as the acting provincial secretary of POPCRU in the Northern Cape twice, in 2004 and from December 2005 until October 2007. When COSATU's Northern Cape structure was established in 2008, she was elected provincial treasurer. She currently serves as the second deputy president of POPCRU.

Parliamentary career
Marekwa became a Member of the National Assembly of South Africa for the African National Congress in November 2021.

References

External links
Profile at Parliament of South Africa

Living people
Tswana people
People from the Northern Cape
Year of birth missing (living people)
African National Congress politicians
Members of the National Assembly of South Africa
Women members of the National Assembly of South Africa
21st-century South African women politicians
21st-century South African politicians